Hérodote is a French language peer-reviewed academic journal covering geography and geopolitics. It was established in 1976 by Yves Lacoste. "Hérodote" is the French version of the name of the ancient Greek historian, Herodotus.

Further reading

External links
 

Geography journals
Works about geopolitics
Publications established in 1976
Quarterly journals
French-language journals